The following outline is provided as an overview of and topical guide to the Gambia:

The Gambia – country in West Africa, officially named the Republic of the Gambia.  The Gambia shares historical roots with many other West African nations in the slave trade, which was the key factor in the placing and keeping of a colony on the Gambia River, first by the Portuguese and later by the British. On 18 February 1965, the Gambia gained independence from the United Kingdom and joined the Commonwealth of Nations. Since gaining independence, the Gambia has enjoyed relative political stability, with the exception of a brief period of military rule in 1994. Thanks to the fertile land of the country, the economy is dominated by farming, fishing, and tourism. About a third of the population lives below the international poverty line of US$1.25 a day.

General reference

 Pronunciation: 
 Common English country name: The Gambia
 Official English country name: (The) Republic of the Gambia
 Common endonym(s):  
 Official endonym(s):  
 Adjectival(s): Gambian (disambiguation)
 ISO country codes: GM, GMB, 270
 ISO region codes: See ISO 3166-2:GM
 Internet country code top-level domain: .gm

Geography of the Gambia 

Geography of the Gambia
 The Gambia is: a country
 Population of the Gambia: 1,709,000 people - 146th most populous country
 Area of the Gambia:  - 164th largest country
 Atlas of the Gambia

Location 
 The Gambia is situated within the following regions:
 Northern Hemisphere and Western Hemisphere
 Africa
 West Africa
 Time zone:  Coordinated Universal Time UTC+00
 Extreme points of the Gambia
 High:  unnamed location 
 Low:  North Atlantic Ocean 0 m
 Land boundaries:   740 km
 Coastline:  North Atlantic Ocean 80 km

Environment of the Gambia 

 Protected areas of the Gambia
 National parks of the Gambia
 Wildlife of the Gambia
 Fauna of the Gambia
 Birds of the Gambia
 Mammals of the Gambia

Natural geographic features of the Gambia 

 Glaciers in the Gambia: none 
 World Heritage Sites in the Gambia

Regions of the Gambia

Administrative divisions of the Gambia 

Administrative divisions of the Gambia
 Divisions of the Gambia
 Districts of the Gambia

Divisions of the Gambia 

Divisions of the Gambia

Districts of the Gambia 

Districts of the Gambia

Municipalities of the Gambia 

 Capital of the Gambia: Banjul
 Cities of the Gambia

Demography of the Gambia 

Demographics of the Gambia

Government and politics of the Gambia 

Government of the Gambia
 Form of government: unitary presidential republic
 Capital of the Gambia: Banjul
 Elections in the Gambia
 Political parties in the Gambia

Executive branch of the government of the Gambia 

 Head of state and head of government: President of the Gambia, Adama Barrow
 Cabinet of the Gambia

Legislative branch of the government of the Gambia 

 National Assembly of the Gambia (unicameral)

Judicial branch of the government of the Gambia

Foreign relations of the Gambia 

Foreign relations of the Gambia
 Diplomatic missions in the Gambia
 Diplomatic missions of the Gambia

International organization membership 
The Republic of the Gambia is a member of:

African, Caribbean, and Pacific Group of States (ACP)
African Development Bank Group (AfDB)
African Union (AU)
African Union/United Nations Hybrid operation in Darfur (UNAMID)
Arab Bank for Economic Development in Africa (ABEDA)
Commonwealth of Nations
Economic Community of West African States (ECOWAS)
Food and Agriculture Organization (FAO)
Group of 77 (G77)
International Bank for Reconstruction and Development (IBRD)
International Civil Aviation Organization (ICAO)
International Criminal Court (ICCt)
International Criminal Police Organization (Interpol)
International Development Association (IDA)
International Federation of Red Cross and Red Crescent Societies (IFRCS)
International Finance Corporation (IFC)
International Fund for Agricultural Development (IFAD)
International Labour Organization (ILO)
International Maritime Organization (IMO)
International Monetary Fund (IMF)
International Olympic Committee (IOC)
International Organization for Migration (IOM)
International Red Cross and Red Crescent Movement (ICRM)
International Telecommunication Union (ITU)

International Telecommunications Satellite Organization (ITSO)
International Trade Union Confederation (ITUC)
Inter-Parliamentary Union (IPU)
Islamic Development Bank (IDB)
Multilateral Investment Guarantee Agency (MIGA)
Nonaligned Movement (NAM)
Organisation of Islamic Cooperation (OIC)
Organisation for the Prohibition of Chemical Weapons (OPCW)
United Nations (UN)
United Nations Conference on Trade and Development (UNCTAD)
United Nations Educational, Scientific, and Cultural Organization (UNESCO)
United Nations Industrial Development Organization (UNIDO)
United Nations Mission in Liberia (UNMIL)
United Nations Mission in the Central African Republic and Chad (MINURCAT)
United Nations Operation in Cote d'Ivoire (UNOCI)
Universal Postal Union (UPU)
World Confederation of Labour (WCL)
World Customs Organization (WCO)
World Federation of Trade Unions (WFTU)
World Health Organization (WHO)
World Intellectual Property Organization (WIPO)
World Meteorological Organization (WMO)
World Tourism Organization (UNWTO)
World Trade Organization (WTO)

Law and order in the Gambia 

 Constitution of the Gambia
 Human rights in the Gambia
 LGBT rights in the Gambia
 Law Enforcement in The Gambia

Military of the Gambia 

Military of the Gambia

History of the Gambia

History of the Gambia by period 
Colonial era
1965 to 1970

History of the Gambia by subject 
Military history of The Gambia
Postage stamps and postal history of the Gambia

Culture of the Gambia 
 National symbols of the Gambia
 Coat of arms of the Gambia
 Flag of the Gambia
 National anthem of the Gambia
 Prostitution in the Gambia
 Public holidays in the Gambia
 Religion in the Gambia
 Christianity in the Gambia
 Islam in the Gambia
 Ahmadiyya in the Gambia
 Serer religion
 World Heritage Sites in the Gambia

Art in the Gambia 
 Gambian literature
 Music of the Gambia

Sports in the Gambia 

 Football in the Gambia
 Gambia at the Olympics

Economy and infrastructure of the Gambia 

Economy of the Gambia
 Economic rank, by nominal GDP (2007): 173rd (one hundred and seventy third)
 Communications in the Gambia
 Internet in the Gambia
Currency of the Gambia: Dalasi
ISO 4217: GMD
 Mining in the Gambia
 Tourism in the Gambia
 Transport in the Gambia
 Airports in the Gambia
 Rail transport in the Gambia

Education in the Gambia 

Education in the Gambia

See also

The Gambia
Index of Gambia-related articles
List of Gambia-related topics
List of international rankings
Member state of the Commonwealth of Nations
Member state of the United Nations
Outline of Africa
Outline of geography

References

External links

 State House and Office of the President
 
 The Gambia. The World Factbook. Central Intelligence Agency.
 

 
 1
Gambia
Gambia